Tiberio Cortesi (died 1602) was a Roman Catholic prelate who served as Bishop of Lavello (1578–1602).

Biography
On 9 July 1578, Tiberio Cortesi was appointed by Pope Gregory XIII as Bishop of Lavello.
He served as Bishop of Lavello until his death in 1602.

See also
Catholic Church in Italy

References

External links and additional sources
 (Chronology of Bishops) 
 (Chronology of Bishops) 

16th-century Italian Roman Catholic bishops
1602 deaths
Bishops appointed by Pope Gregory XIII